The Criminal Law Act (Northern Ireland) 1967 (c 18) (NI) is an Act of the Parliament of Northern Ireland. It makes similar provision to the Criminal Law Act 1967 for Northern Ireland.

Section 2
This section was repealed by article 90(2) of, and Part I of Schedule 7 to the Police and Criminal Evidence (Northern Ireland) Order 1989 (SI 1989/1341) (NI 12).

Section 8
This section was repealed by section 122(2) of, and Part II of Schedule 7 to the Judicature (Northern Ireland) Act 1978.

Section 10
This section was repealed by the Magistrates' Courts (Northern Ireland) Order 1981 (SI 1981/1675) (NI 26).

Section 12
In section 12(1), the words "and to subsection (2)" were repealed by section 122(2) of, and Part II of Schedule 7 to the Judicature (Northern Ireland) Act 1978.

Section 12(2) was repealed by section 122(2) of, and Part II of Schedule 7 to the Judicature (Northern Ireland) Act 1978.

See also
Criminal Law Act

References

External links

The Criminal Law Act (Northern Ireland) 1967, as amended from the National Archives.

Acts of the Parliament of Northern Ireland 1967
Criminal law of Northern Ireland